The Capt. William Hallett House is a historic house in the Hyannis village of Barnstable, Massachusetts, USA.

Description and history 
This -story wood-frame house was built c. 1800, and exhibits a distinctive combination of Federal and Queen Anne styling. While its basic form is that of a Federal-style Cape, it was altered in the late 19th century, adding a shed-roof dormer with an eyebrow section, a porch with turned posts, and a projecting window bay. In the mid-19th century the house belonged to William Hallett, a ship's captain, and around the turn of the 20th century by Dr. Charles Harris, a noted local physician and author of Hyannis Sea Captains.

The house was listed on the National Register of Historic Places on September 18, 1987.

See also
National Register of Historic Places listings in Barnstable County, Massachusetts

References

Houses in Barnstable, Massachusetts
National Register of Historic Places in Barnstable, Massachusetts
Houses on the National Register of Historic Places in Barnstable County, Massachusetts
Queen Anne architecture in Massachusetts
Federal architecture in Massachusetts